Bab Qinnasrin, meaning the Gate of Qinnasrin is one of the gates of the medieval Old City of Aleppo in northern Syria. In its present form, it dates to 1256.

History
The gate was originally built by the Hamdanid ruler Sayf al-Dawla in 964, and fitted with the doors of the gate of Amorium, taken as spoils by Caliph al-Mu'tasim after his sack of the city in 838. Al-Mu'tasim installed them at the entrance of his palace in Samarra, until they were taken, probably towards the end of the 9th century, and installed at Raqqa, whence Sayf al-Dawla in turn took them.

Significant damage to the gate occurred as part of armed conflict in Aleppo during the Syrian war.

References

Ayyubid architecture in Syria
Ziyarat
Qinnasrin